Saudi Arabia competed at the 2000 Summer Olympics in Sydney, Australia.
The nation won its first Olympic medals at these Games.

Medalists

Results by event

Athletics
Men's 100m
Jamal Al-Saffar
 Round 1 – 10.75 (→ did not advance)

Men's 200m
Salem Al-Yami
 Round 1 – 21.18 (→ did not advance)

Men's 400m
Hamdan Al-Bishi
 Round 1 – 45.22
 Round 2 – 45.35
 Semifinal – 45.98 (→ did not advance)

Men's 110m Hurdles
Mubarak Mubarak
 Round 1 – DSQ (→ did not advance)

Men's 400m Hurdles
Hadi Souan Somayli
 Round 1 – 49.28
 Semifinal – 48.14
 Final – 47.53 (→  Silver Medal)

Men's 4 × 100 m Relay
Jamal Al-Saffar, Salem Al-Yami, Mohamed Al-Yami, and Mubarak Mubarak
 Round 1 – 39.94 (→ did not advance)

Men's 4 × 400 m Relay
Mohammed Albeshi, Hamdan Al-Bishi, Hamed Al-Bishi, and Hadi Souan Somayli
 Round 1 – 03:09.57 (→ did not advance)

Swimming
Men's 100m Breaststroke
Ahmad Al-Kudmani
 Preliminary Heat – 01:06.07 (→ did not advance)

Taekwondo

References
Wallechinsky, David (2004). The Complete Book of the Summer Olympics (Athens 2004 Edition). Toronto, Canada. . 
International Olympic Committee (2001). The Results. Retrieved 12 November 2005.
Sydney Organising Committee for the Olympic Games (2001). Official Report of the XXVII Olympiad Volume 1: Preparing for the Games. Retrieved 20 November 2005.
Sydney Organising Committee for the Olympic Games (2001). Official Report of the XXVII Olympiad Volume 2: Celebrating the Games. Retrieved 20 November 2005.
Sydney Organising Committee for the Olympic Games (2001). The Results. Retrieved 20 November 2005.
International Olympic Committee Web Site

Nations at the 2000 Summer Olympics
2000
2000 in Saudi Arabian sport